Love Minus Zero Recordings is the second subsidiary record label created by siblings Richard and Stephanie Reines (Co-Owners of Drive-Thru Records and Rushmore Records).

Love Minus Zero's was incepted in celebration of Drive-Thru's 10th anniversary. It specialises in the field of Singer-Songwriter music.

November 2006 saw the launch of the labels website and MySpace profile.

Current roster
 Biirdie
 Roark

Releases
 Roark - Break of Day (February 20, 2007)
 Biirdie - Catherine Avenue (October 30, 2007)

See also
 List of record labels

External links
 Official site
 MySpace Profile

American independent record labels
Record labels established in 2006
2006 establishments in California